The 42nd Academy of Country Music Awards were held on May 15, 2007, at the MGM Grand Garden Arena, Las Vegas, Nevada. The ceremony was hosted by ACM Award Winner Reba McEntire.

Winners and nominees 
Winners are shown in bold.

References 

Academy of Country Music Awards
Academy of Country Music Awards
Academy of Country Music Awards
Academy of Country Music Awards
Academy of Country Music Awards
Academy of Country Music Awards